Köyceğiz is a village in the Hayrat, Trabzon, in Black Sea Region of Turkey.

History 
According to a source dating 1928, name of the village is Kalanta. Most villagers are ethnically Laz.

Geography

References

Villages in Trabzon Province
Laz settlements in Turkey